"Dancing on the Waves" is a song by We the Kingdom that was released as the lead single from their debut extended play, Live at the Wheelhouse (2019) and Holy Water (2020), on August 16, 2019. The song was written by Andrew Bergthold, Ed Cash, Franni Cash, Kyle Briskin, Martin Cash, and Scott Cash.

"Dancing on the Waves" peaked at No. 29 on the US Hot Christian Songs chart.

Background
The live version of "Dancing on the Waves" was released on August 16, 2019, as the first single from We the Kingdom. The track appeared on the group's debut EP, Live at the Wheelhouse, released in October 2019. An acoustic version of the song by the band was released on the Live Acoustic Sessions EP on March 6, 2020. On August 7, 2020, We the Kingdom released a studio-recorded version of the song on their debut album, Holy Water (2020). On September 10, 2021, We the Kingdom released the radio version of the song as a single.

Composition
The singers' vocal range spans from G♯3 to C♯5.

Commercial performance
"Dancing on the Waves" debuted at No. 48 on the US Christian Airplay chart.

Music videos
The live music video of "Dancing on the Waves", recorded at Young Life Sharptop Cove in Jasper, Georgia, was released by We the Kingdom on August 16, 2019, on YouTube. An acoustic performance video of the song recorded at the Boiler Room at Neuhoff Site, Nashville, Tennessee, was published on YouTube on November 7, 2019. On August 7, 2020, We the Kingdom released an audio video of the song showcasing the Holy Water cover art. We the Kingdom released the lyric video for the radio version of "Dancing on the Waves" on September 10, 2021.

Track listing

Charts

Weekly charts

Year-end charts

Release history

Other versions
 Bethel Music and We the Kingdom performed a rendition of song which was released as part of Bethel Music's album, Peace (2020).

References

External links
  on PraiseCharts
 

2019 songs
2019 singles
We the Kingdom songs
Songs written by Ed Cash